Novi Biliari is an urban-type settlement in Odesa Raion of Odesa Oblast in Ukraine. Population: 

Novi Biliari is located on the right bank of the Small Adzhalyk Estuary, east of the city of Odesa.

Economy

Transportation
Novi Biliari is on the Highway M28 connecting Odesa with Yuzhne where it connects to the Highway M14 which runs to Mykolaiv.

There is a railway line which runs from Chornomorska to Novi Biliari, but there is no passenger traffic. The closest railway stations with passenger traffic are in Odessa.

References

Urban-type settlements in Odesa Raion